Pulpit Lake is a small alpine lake in Custer County, Idaho, United States, located in the Sawtooth Mountains in the Sawtooth National Recreation Area.  There are no trails leading to the lake or its drainage. Cross country access to Pulpit Lake and the Cradle Canyon area is from the high point of the Alpine Way Trail between Crooked Creek and Stanley Lake.

Pulpit Lake is in the Sawtooth Wilderness, and a wilderness permit can be obtained at a registration box at trailheads or wilderness boundaries.  The lake is just to the southeast of McGowan Peak and upstream of Stanley Lake.

References

See also
 List of lakes of the Sawtooth Mountains (Idaho)
 Sawtooth National Forest
 Sawtooth National Recreation Area
 Sawtooth Range (Idaho)

Lakes of Idaho
Lakes of Custer County, Idaho
Glacial lakes of the United States
Glacial lakes of the Sawtooth Wilderness